An economic bad is the opposite of an economic good. A 'bad' is anything with a negative value to the consumer, or a negative price in the marketplace. Refuse is an example of a bad.

A bad is a physical object that lowers a consumer's level of happiness, or stated alternately, a bad is an object whose consumption or presence lowers the utility of the consumer.

With normal goods, a two-party transaction results in the exchange of money for some object, as when money is exchanged for a car. With a bad, however, both money and the object in question go the same direction, as when a household gives up both money and garbage to a waste collector being compensated to take the garbage. In this way, garbage has a negative price; the waste collector is receiving both garbage and money and thus is paying a negative amount for the garbage.

References
Varian, Hal R. (2006), Intermediate Microeconomics (London: W.W. Norton & Company)

See also 
 Chore division - the problem of fairly dividing a heterogeneous bad among agents with different preferences.

Goods (economics)